Leucoedemia is a genus of moths in the family Lyonetiidae.

Species
Leucoedemia ingens Scoble & Scholtz, 1984

References

Lyonetiidae